Wichita West High School, known locally as West, is a public secondary school in Wichita, Kansas, United States. It is operated by Wichita USD 259 school district and serves students in grades 9 to 12. The high school is located southwest of downtown Wichita and near U.S. Route 54. The current principal is Mark Jolliffe.

History
Wichita West High School opened in September 1953, but a council had started looking to build a high school for the westside of the Arkansas River in 1925. Three years after its opening, Wichita West added 25 classrooms with an addition of 24 mobile units 15 years later. In 1976, a new library was added to the building with the existing library being renovated. Renovations again took place in 1988 and 1989, due to the school district moving the ninth grade to the high schools.

Extracurricular activities

Athletics 
Wichita West won city league titles in football in 1993 and 1995.

State championships

Notable people

Alumni
Karla Burns, operatic mezzo-soprano and actress

Faculty
Eddie Kriwiel, football and golf coach, member of 7 Kansas Halls of Fame

See also

 Education in Kansas
 List of high schools in Kansas
 List of unified school districts in Kansas

References

External links
 
Historical
 Excerpts from A History of Wichita Public School Buildings, USD 259
Map
 Wichita School District - High School Boundary Map, valid starting fall 2012, USD 259
 Wichita School District - Boundary Map and Directory of Buildings, USD 259

Schools in Wichita, Kansas
Educational institutions established in 1953
Public high schools in Kansas
1953 establishments in Kansas